The A12 locomotives of the London and South Western Railway were built between the years 1887 and 1895 to the design of William Adams. Ninety of the locomotives were built, fifty at Nine Elms Works and forty by Neilson and Company, although the latter together with the final twenty from Nine Elms were officially known as the O4 class. They were unusual for their time, with a wheel arrangement of 0-4-2. This arrangement was used by few of the other railway companies, and never proved popular (although the Great Northern Railway had 150 such locomotives). They bore the nickname "Jubilees", because the first batch appeared in the Golden Jubilee of Queen Victoria's reign.

History
The 90 examples of the class were built in batches, as shown in the following table.

All 90 passed to the Southern Railway in 1923, following the introduction of the Grouping Act.

Withdrawal
Withdrawals started in 1928, with four of the class surviving to Nationalisation. The four operated by British Railways were all withdrawn in its first year (1948), excluding DS3191 which was used for steam supply at Eastleigh Works and lasted until 1951. No members of the class have been preserved.

Notes

References

External links
  SREmG details

A12
0-4-2 locomotives
Neilson locomotives
Railway locomotives introduced in 1887
Scrapped locomotives
Standard gauge steam locomotives of Great Britain